Teriyaki Boyz are a Japanese hip hop group from Yokohama, Japan.

History 
The group consists of Ilmari and Ryo-Z from Rip Slyme, Verbal from M-Flo, rapper Wise and Nigo, the DJ and founder of the popular Japanese streetwear brand A Bathing Ape. Hence the group members are prominently seen sporting Bathing Ape wear for live concerts and in music videos.

Their debut album from Def Jam Recordings and (B)APE Sounds, titled Beef or Chicken was produced by an array of rap and electronica producers including Adrock of the Beastie Boys, Cornelius, Cut Chemist, Daft Punk, Dan the Automator, DJ Premier, DJ Shadow, Just Blaze, Jermaine Dupri, Mark Ronson, and The Neptunes. Their first single "HeartBreaker", was produced by Daft Punk and contains elements of the Daft Punk song "Human After All". The group has gone on to collaborate with renowned rap artists Kanye West, Jay-Z, Pharrell, Busta Rhymes, and Big Sean for their subsequent singles.

Two tracks by the Teriyaki Boyz were featured on The Fast and the Furious: Tokyo Drift soundtrack, the title track Tokyo Drift (Fast & Furious), and "Cho L A R G E", featuring Pharrell which had previously been released on their debut album.

Discography

Studio albums

Mixtapes

Singles

Other appearances

Video albums

Notes

References

External links

Japanese hip hop groups
Japanese pop music groups
Musical groups established in 2005
Musical groups from Tokyo